Bournemouth, Christchurch and Poole Council is a unitary local authority for the district of Bournemouth, Christchurch and Poole in England that came into being on 1 April 2019. It was created from the areas that were previously administered by the unitary authorities of Bournemouth and Poole and the non-metropolitan district of Christchurch.

The first elections to the council took place in May 2019. The current leader of the council is Deputy Leader Philip Broadhead, as interim leader of the council, following the resignation of previous council leader Drew Mellor in February 2023.

Shadow authority
Statutory instruments for the creation of the new authority were made on behalf of the Secretary of State for Housing, Communities and Local Government on 25 May 2018, and a shadow authority was formed the following day.

The Shadow Bournemouth, Christchurch and Poole Council had 125 members, being the elected councillors from Bournemouth Borough Council, Christchurch Borough Council, Poole Borough Council and the five councillors from Dorset County Council who were elected from divisions within Christchurch. Similarly a shadow authority was created for Dorset Council, consisting of the borough and county councillors of Dorset, excluding those from Christchurch. The Bournemouth, Christchurch and Poole shadow authority formed a shadow executive committee of eight councillors from Bournemouth Borough Council, two from Christchurch Borough Council and six from Poole Borough Council. The shadow authority and initially the council itself met in lecture theatres at Bournemouth University, as no other space was large enough to host all 125 members.

The first meeting of the shadow authority was held on Wednesday 6 June 2018. Ray Nottage was elected Chair of the shadow authority and Ann Stribley was elected Vice-Chair. A shadow executive committee was also formed and met for the first time on 15 June 2018, at which point Janet Walton was appointed Shadow Council Leader.

Elected Council 

On 2 May 2019, as part of the wider local elections, the authority held elections to replace the shadow authority. Whereas the shadow authority had had 125 members, new ward boundaries created by the Local Government Boundary Commission reduced this number to 76, across 33 multi-member wards. Whilst the Conservative Party won most seats, they lost their majority, with the newly elected council under no-overall control. The Liberal Democrats were the second largest party, with 15 seats. Other parties elected included Poole People (7), Labour (3), the Greens (2), the Alliance for Local Living (1) and UKIP (1), alongside 11 independents. After negotiations, all groups other than the Conservatives and UKIP formed a "Unity Alliance administration, with Vikki Slade (leader of the Lib Dem group) elected Leader of the Council and members of other parties receiving Cabinet positions.

In October 2019, two Poole People councillors left the party, with one remaining as part of the Unity Alliance and one resigning from the group. In April 2020 Christchurch Independents councillor Colin Bungey of the Commons ward died, with his seat becoming vacant, leading to the Unity Alliance having a minority of one. Whereas a by-election would normally have been held shortly afterwards, this was postponed due to the ongoing COVID-19 pandemic. Conservative group leader Drew Mellor moved for a vote of no confidence to be held in the now minority administration, which was held on 9 June. All 75 serving councillors attended the virtual council meeting, in which all 36 Conservative councillors and one Independent voted for the motion, with the 37 Unity Alliance councillors voting against and the single UKIP councillor abstaining. The vote was therefore tied 37-37, and David Flagg, chairman of the Council, used his casting vote to defeat the motion - dedicating his casting vote to the memory of the late Colin Bungey.

Subsequent to this, Liberal Democrat councillor Pete Parish of the Canford Heath ward died, and independent (and former Poole People) councillor Julie Bagwell left the Unity Alliance, which left the Unity Alliance with 34 seats. A second vote of no confidence was tabled for 15 September 2020, generating 39 votes in support and 33 votes against, ending Vikki Slade's tenure as Council leader. At a 1 October meeting to determine the new leader, Drew Mellor, leader of the Conservative group, received 40 votes while Vikki Slade received 33, with one councillor abstaining. The Christchurch Independents group, who are formed from former Christchurch Conservative Councillors, rejected an offer to become part of the new administration, meaning that the Conservatives remain a minority administration.

On 20 September 2021, it was reported that four councillors from varying groups had crossed the floor to join the Conservative administration, allowing the Conservative group to form the majority on the council for the first time. These councillors were: Steve Baron (Parkstone), Daniel Butt (Hamworthy), Toby Johnson (Alderney and Bourne Valley) and Nigel Brooks (Highcliffe and Walkford). Baron and Brooks had already been appointed to remunerated positions as Cabinet assistants, working with Mellor's administration, and Johnson was appointed to a remunerated post two months after his defection.

Political groupings 
Most councillors were elected as part of a political party, with eleven elected as independents alongside several localist parties; subsequently parties were able to form political groups, which may be made up of several political parties; the allocation of seats on committees is based on the proportion of these groups. There are currently six groups, with seven unaligned councillors, and two vacant seats. Whilst the Conservatives, Liberal Democrats, and Labour Party sit by themselves, some parties and independents joined together in groups; the Christchurch Independents was formed as a grouping of independents within the Christchurch area of the district, who ran for BCP Council after several were suspended from the Conservative Party for opposing the plans that lead to the creation of the new authority; Poole People joined together win the one ALL Councillor, Felicity Rice, to form a group; the two Green councillors joined with two independents in Bournemouth to form the Bournemouth Independents and Green group (originally the Bournemouth Group), The remaining independents and UKIP councillor are unaligned and thus sit by themselves, with the two other seats remaining vacant. Note that the current composition differs from the groups composition after the 2019 election, with such developments outlined above.

In 2021, after the by-elections for the Canford Heath and Commons wards, the Poole People and ALL Group was renamed to Poole Independents, composed of the remaining Poole People and ALL Councillors, alongside independent former Poole People councillor Pete Miles.

The Poole Local Group was formed in June 2022. On 3 October 2022 Redhill and Northbourne councillor Jackie Edwards left the Conservatives to sit as an Independent. Three days later the Christchurch Independents held Highcliffe and Walkford in a by-election.

Drew Mellor's administration

'The Big Plan' and FuturePlaces

Having obtained power in 2020, Mellor's administration announced a "Big Plan" to "harness the potential of our coastline of opportunity" - although the plan also included some more specific pledges, such as rejuvenating Poole and investing in the Bournemouth International Centre. To facilitate this work, the Council set up a wholly-owned urban regeneration company, BCP FuturePlaces Limited, with Mellor and his deputy Philip Broadhead initially on the board, albeit unpaid. The company attracted controversy from the outset, with concerns about the six-figure salaries paid to its senior management and its reliance on large infusions of public money, including £3.404 million allocated to it in November 2021 and an £8 million working capital loan advanced in July 2022. As of October 2022, the company still hadn't produced an outline business case for any of its regeneration projects, these plans being pushed back first until the end of the year, then until 2023.

Bournemouth city status

Another aim of the "Big Plan" was to "invest in an iconic cityscape", and in November 2021 BCP Council voted for Bournemouth to enter the Platinum Jubilee Civic Honours competition in an effort to acquire city status. Broadhead had intimated earlier in the year that residents would be consulted prior to any such application, but in the event they were not consulted, and nor was the Bournemouth Civic Society (whose members strongly opposed city status) or the Throop and Holdenhurst Village Council. It later transpired that the application, though for Bournemouth only, contained photographs of multiple sites in Poole and Christchurch. The application proved unsuccessful in any case, Bournemouth losing out to Doncaster and Milton Keynes.

Abolition of the Overview and Scrutiny Board, and Covidgate

The Mellor administration featured seven times in Private Eye during 2022, initially following its decision to abolish the Council's overview and scrutiny board (OSB), which held Mellor's monthly Cabinets to account. The debate on abolishing the OSB began at full Council on 26 April 2022, and due to a large number of absences on the Conservative side the Opposition won an amendment that would have retained the OSB while introducing extra scrutiny. Two Conservative councillors with COVID were then telephoned during an interval and turned up to the debate shortly afterwards, despite having sent apologies hours previously on COVID-related grounds. The meeting was then abandoned due to health and safety concerns, and at the reconvened meeting on 10 May there were enough Conservatives present to win a successive amendment which abolished the OSB and replaced it with four smaller committees which would meet less frequently. Members of the Conservative group were elected to the chairs and vice-chairs of these new committees (giving Mellor's party the casting votes) - despite the convention, evident on Dorset Council and elsewhere, that scrutiny committees are chaired by Opposition members. Cabinet assistants, too, were installed as members of the new committees, effectively scrutinising their Cabinet colleagues' handiwork, though they were removed from all scrutiny committees following a vote at full Council on 5 December 2022.

Beach huts policy, and the KPMG reports

Mellor's most controversial policy was his proposal to sell the Council's 3,605 beach huts to a Council-owned company for twenty years, to cancel out a £54 million transformation overspend. A report on commercialising Council assets was commissioned from KPMG in 2021 and this, the first in a series of reports from KPMG, was completed on 22 September 2021. The report warned that if a Council-owned company could only acquire Council assets because the Council had loaned it the money to do so, then "it is probable that the original borrowing undertaken by the Council ... would be deemed to be for an improper purpose"; similarly, if the Council were to provide a guarantee to the company to enable it to borrow the requisite funds, this too could "be deemed ... for an improper purpose". A second report, specifically on beach hut sales, was then commissioned from KPMG and completed on 22 November 2021. At the Council's budget meeting on 22 February 2022, Mellor denied that a completed report from KPMG existed, instead stating that he had "received comfort" from KPMG about the soundness of his policy following "a series of workshops". The beach hut scheme was voted through, therefore, without Council having had sight of the foregoing warnings.

After several delays, the beach hut scheme came before the Council's corporate and community overview and scrutiny committee on 20 July 2022. Mellor did not turn up to the meeting, no reports were produced, while a Democratic Services officer was left to answer heated questions from residents and beach-hut tenants. The Conservatives' chief whip then proposed that the meeting be adjourned prior to any debate - despite Procedure Rule 17 of the Council's Constitution, which forbids the use of the whip on scrutiny committees. Nine days later, Greg Clark, the Secretary of State for Levelling-Up, announced that he was stepping in to outlaw the beach-hut scheme. It transpired that Kemi Badenoch, a minister in the Department for Levelling Up, Housing and Communities, had written to Mellor on 16 June expressing "concerns" that the regulations surrounding asset disposals were "not being used appropriately, as the assets ultimately remain within the Council's group structure". Greg Clark went on the record to denounce councils that make "dodgy deals", and on 1 August he wrote to Mellor stating that he was tightening up the guidance on local authority asset disposals, adding: "I will not hesitate to act where the spirit of the law is ignored or flouted". BCP Council meanwhile set about applying for a £76 million "capitalisation direction", essentially a loan from Government, to balance its books.

The KPMG reports were finally published at the end of August 2022, by which time the beach hut policy had already been outlawed. At back-to-back scrutiny meetings on 2 September, Mellor denied several times that he had played any part in suppressing the KPMG reports at the time of the February budget. The following week, at Cabinet, he stated that he had, in fact, suggested that the reports be held back.

Petition to remove Cllrs Mellor and Broadhead from office

A petition from local residents to remove Mellor from office - along with his deputy, Philip Broadhead - was debated at BCP Council on 8 November 2022, having attracted 2,066 valid signatures. A Conservative backbencher, Duane Farr, attacked the petition organiser Ian Lawrence during the debate, attributing the petition's authorship to "politically motivated trolls", "creepy, sad little people with nothing better to do", who "need calling out and exposing". The Council voted to take no action over the petition.

Resignation

Mellor resigned as council leader on 13 February 2023, and announced he would not stand for re-election in May 2023.

See also
 Bournemouth, Christchurch and Poole
 South East Dorset conurbation

Notes

References

External links
 Bournemouth, Christchurch and Poole Council

Local government in Bournemouth
Bournemouth, Christchurch and Poole
Bournemouth
Unitary authority councils of England
2019 establishments in England
Local authorities in Dorset